Reni Folawiyo is a Nigerian lawyer turned fashion entrepreneur, business woman and founder of Alara, West Africa’s first fashion luxury and lifestyle concept store which was designed by British-Ghanaian architect David Adjaye. She owns NOK and NOK Garden by Alara to promote African cuisine.

Early life and education 
Folawiyo was born in London to late Chief Lateef Adegbite, former Attorney General of Nigeria and former Secretary-General of the Nigerian Supreme Council for Islamic Affairs and raised in Abeokuta, Ogun state, Nigeria.

She studied commercial law in the University of Warwick, United Kingdom and came back to Nigeria to start practising in her father's law firm

Personal life 
She married Nigerian businessman Tunde Folawiyo in 1989 and they have two children, Faridah and Fuaad.

References 

Living people
Nigerian women fashion designers
Year of birth missing (living people)
Nigerian fashion businesspeople
Alumni of the University of Warwick